Slovak names consist of a given name and a family name (surname). Slovakia uses the Western name order with the given name first and the surname last, although there is a historical tradition to reverse this order, especially in official context (like in administrative papers and legal documents) as well as on gravestones and memorials.

Most Slovaks do not have a middle name. The family name forms for males and females are distinct in Slovakia, making it possible to identify gender from the name alone. As of 2003 there were 185,288 different family names in use among 5.4 million Slovaks, or one family name for every 29 citizens. There is an estimated 90,000 lineages in Slovakia. With marriage, the bride typically adopts the bridegroom's surname. Slovak names are very similar to Czech names.

The most common Slovak given name are Jozef (male) and Mária (female); the most common family name in Slovakia is Horváth (male) and Horváthová (female).

Given names

Given names in Slovakia are called baptismal names even though today they are completely separate from the Christian baptismal names. Proper baptismal names given during infant baptism are still common in the countryside, yet they are only seldom used within the official name (if they are, they form the person's middle name). Generally, names in Slovakia can be of several distinct origins:
 Slavic names of pre-Christian origin (e.g. Dobromil)
 Christian names often inspired by saints (e.g. Vojtech)
 Names of past kings and rulers (e.g. Ladislav)
 Modern names (e.g. Lukas)
 Names of ethnic minorities living in Slovakia (e.g. Béla)

Traditionally, it was common to choose a given name for the newborn from within the family; grandfather and grandmother names being particularly popular. While this is no longer as common as in the past, it is still widely practiced especially in the rural areas.

Many Slovak given names, like in most other Slavic naming systems, have a diminutive and shorter version, which is used in an informal context. For example, the diminutive of Slavomír is Slavo, of Vojtech — Vojto, of Alexandra — Saša, etc. Sometimes these diminutive names become independent and "official" given names. Some older, traditional given names have distinct shortened forms, quite different from the original, for example Štefan — Victor, Pišta, etc. These traditional shortened forms are becoming quite rare in everyday usage.

Surnames

Surnames differ according to gender. Generally feminine form is created by adding suffix "ová" to the masculine form. In some cases a "y"/"ý" at the end of a masculine name is replaced with an "á".  Feminine names almost always end in "á" while masculine names almost never do. Note that á is a different character from a. For example, Bača is a masculine form while Bačová would be feminine.  Because Slovakia also has people with Hungarian, German, and other ancestors, some surnames in Slovakia will follow the convention of those languages and not conform to these norms.

Some popular surnames include:

 derived from professions:

Kováč – smith,
Mlynár – miller,
Bača – shepherd,
Rybár – fisher,
Kráľ – king,
Pekár – baker,
Kuchár – cook,
Mäsiar – butcher,
Holič – barber,
Maliar – painter,
Kľúčiar – key maker,
Mečiar – sword maker,
Sklenár – glass maker.

 derived from adjectives:

Čierny – black,
Biely – white,
Suchý – dry,
Mokrý – wet,
Slaný – salty,
Smutný – sad,
Šťastný – happy/lucky,
Malý – small,
Široký – wide,
Tichý – quiet,
Surový – raw.

 other:

Koreň – root,
Chren – horseradish,
Repa – beet,
Slanina – bacon,
Polievka – soup,
Cibuľka – little onion,
Malina – raspberry,
Dobrovodský – good water,
Holub – pigeon,
Chrobák – beetle,
Komár – mosquito,
Medvedík – little bear,
Koleno – knee,
Mráz – frost,
Okienka – little window,
Otčenáš – our father (as in the “Our Father” prayer),
Bezdeda – without a grandpa,
Dolina – valley,
Kocur – tom cat.

See also
 Slavic surnames
 Name days in Slovakia
 Czech name
 Slovak identity card

References

External links
 Czech and Slovak given names

Names by culture
Slavic-language names
Slovak culture